George Beven (1929 – 29 January 2023) was a Sri Lankan-English designer, artist, fashion designer and journalist. He is best remembered for his use of colour. He is regarded as one of Sri Lanka's finest figurative painters as well as one of Sri Lanka's greatest contemporary artists. He lived majority of his life in England but had made occasional visits to Sri Lanka to conduct art exhibitions at various locations including Barefoot and Lionel Wendt Art Centre.

Early life 
He initially studied at Newstead College, Negombo where his mother taught him music until the age of 12. He was also a child dancer during his stay at Newstead College. He was convinced and encouraged by his art teacher at Newstead College to paint and send his entries to art competitions in England.

He later switched to Maris Stella College where he found his groove and passion pointed towards painting which he pursued as a hobby. He even sent a couple of line drawings to the Ceylon Observer for which the Editor of the Women's Pages Anne Abayasekara responded with a job offer for him to work as an artist for the newspaper press. However, he was initially reluctant to accept it as he was preparing for his SSC examinations and promised that he will join once he completed his exams. He later became the first paid artist on the Ceylon Observer.  He was sent for evening classes at Heywood Art College where he eventually learnt the art of drawing human figure from the renowned artist David Paynter.

Career 
He initially embarked on a career pursuing journalism when he began his stint with The Observer. He was initially sent by Associated Newspapers of Ceylon Limited to Saint Martin's School of Art, London in 1955 in order to learn more of his craft on fashion designing and illustration. He then returned to Sri Lanka a year later in 1956 after gaining experience working as a journalist, artist and as a fashion designer. His return to his mother country was overshadowed by turn of events triggered by the consequences of the implementation of infamous Sinhala Only Act in 1956. However, he decided to settle in the UK in 1958 after seeing both his mother and sister migrating to the UK.

He conducted his first solo exhibition in 1958 at the Royal Empire Society. He also made a name for himself with his ability of painting in oils using his fingers. He also cemented his reputation and stamped his authority in tooth brush paintings during the 1970s, 1980s and 1990s and his tooth brush paintings portrayed many famous artists of the time including the likes of Margot Fonteyn, Rudolf Nureyev, Mikhail Baryshmikov from the classical ballet as well as veteran Hollywood actors such as Marlene Dietrich, Judy Garland, Liza Minnelli, Marilyn Monroe, James Dean and Sylvester Stallone. He was also a clever artist having done lot of research and experimenting with poster colours and gouache using the most unlikely colour combinations in order to provoke the eyes of the viewers.

Personal life and death 
He initially met his lifelong partner Wolfgang Stange in the early 1970s. He died on 29 January 2023 at his residence in London.

References 

1929 births
2023 deaths
People from Negombo
Sri Lankan contemporary artists
Sri Lankan painters
Sri Lankan artists
Sri Lankan journalists
Alumni of Maris Stella College
Sri Lankan expatriates in the United Kingdom